This is a list of singles that charted in the top ten of the ARIA Charts in 2008.

Top-ten singles

Key

2007 peaks

2009 peaks

Entries by artist
The following table shows artists who achieved two or more top 10 entries in 2008, including songs that reached their peak in 2007 and 2009. The figures include both main artists and featured artists. The total number of weeks an artist spent in the top ten in 2008 is also shown.

References

Australia Singles top 10
2008 in Australian music
Top 10 singles 2008
Australia 2008